Hipólito Pires is a Portuguese businessman and founder of Portaro together with José Megre in 1975. He and José Megre got together as industrial partners when they decided to start creating a motor vehicle assembly production line under the name "Projecto Portaro" when large loans of Portuguese-state funds were granted to start this new joint-venture automobile plan. Once the cashflow was assured and delivered so did the brand name PORTARO. Initially the well known GV-Garagem Vitoria the one of the domestic main Motor Car Importers were to collect and receive the ARO vehicles from Romania at the docks in CKD form and transported them for their final production facility to Setubal where several 4X4 prototype models were built soon that year in 1975 all with different running gear fitted for testing them in all kinds of environment and treatment.

Soon enough, Pires went to Japan in search for a well-known manufacturer and supplier of modern running gear, but only Daihatsu Motor Company of Osaka, Japan agreed to help him out and negotiations started. Not long after, the famous Brandname of PORTARO 4WD vehicles were launched after their vehicles were involved in off-road trials and other successful evaluations. The motor vehicle production was officially started by the recently formed SEMAL company.

References 

Living people
21st-century Portuguese businesspeople
Year of birth missing (living people)